is a former-professional Japanese cyclist, who last rode for UCI Continental team . He has won a stage at the HC classified Tour of Hainan and won the overall classification twice in a row at the Tour of Thailand.

Personal life
He graduated from the National Institute of Fitness and Sports in Kanoya in 2007.

Major results

2006
 1st Young rider classification Tour de Hokkaido
2009
 1st Kumamoto International Road Race
 9th Overall Tour de Okinawa
2010
 3rd Banja Luka–Belgrade I
 7th Kumamoto International Road Race
2011
 1st Stage 4 Tour de Singkarak
 1st Stage 2 Tour of Hainan
2012
 1st Stage 6 Tour de Singkarak
 3rd Overall Jelajah Malaysia
 3rd Tour de Okinawa
2013
 3rd Overall Tour of Thailand
 4th Overall Tour de Korea
 10th Ronde Pévéloise
2014
 1st  Overall Tour of Thailand
1st Points classification
 7th Overall Tour de East Java
1st  Points classification
1st Stage 1
2015
 1st  Overall Tour of Thailand
2017
 7th Tour de Okinawa
2018
 1st Overall Sri Lanka T-Cup
1st Stage 1
2019
 1st Points classification Tour de Taiwan
 9th Overall Tour de Iskandar Johor

References

External links

1984 births
Living people
Japanese male cyclists
Sportspeople from Fukui Prefecture
People from Echizen, Fukui